The Filipino Channel, commonly known as TFC, is a 24-hour global subscription television network based in Daly City, California with studios in Redwood City, California and offices in Africa, Australia, Brazil, Canada, Cayman Islands, UAE, Ethiopia, Hungary, Israel, Japan, Mexico, Middle East, the Netherlands, New Zealand, South Africa, Malaysia, Singapore, Thailand, Indonesia and the United Kingdom. It is owned and operated by the Filipino media conglomerate ABS-CBN Corporation. Its programming is composed primarily of imported programs from Filipino cable channel Kapamilya Channel and programs produced and distributed by ABS-CBN Entertainment (entertainment) and ABS-CBN News and Current Affairs (news and current affairs), while ABS-CBN television network is currently inactive due to its shutdown.

TFC is available globally on direct-to-home satellite, cable, Internet Protocol television, online streaming, video on demand and on other over-the-top content platforms. TFC is targeted to the Filipino diaspora, and was launched on September 24, 1994, becoming the world's first trans-Pacific Asian broadcaster.

As of 2016, The Filipino Channel has over three million subscribers worldwide in over 40 countries across 4 continents, most of whom are in the United States, Middle East, Europe, Australia, Canada, Japan, South Korea, Brazil, Hong Kong, Indonesia, Thailand, Singapore and Malaysia.

It has successfully completed its migration to high-definition in all of its international feed with its EMEA feed the last to convert on February 20, 2021. It is the first and only Philippine-based cable network worldwide to be broadcast in HD to date.

History

While TFC traces its origins to 1994, the idea of broadcasting television programming via satellite to the millions of the Filipino diaspora everywhere in the world was an innovative idea that the then ABS-CBN Broadcasting Corporation (now ABS-CBN Corporation) took in the late 1980s, just as it began its road of reconstruction after the brutal and infamous years of Martial Law and the post-EDSA People Power era. As the network in 1989 began to become once more the Philippines' leading television network, the network finally made the bold step to begin satellite transmissions to Filipinos abroad when in the fall of that very year, ABS-CBN programs were broadcast via satellite to the Northern Mariana Islands, especially to the Filipino families living in Guam and Saipan, making it the first ever Philippine television network to broadcast to viewers outside the country via satellite.

On September 24, 1994, ABS-CBN, through its newly established subsidiary ABS-CBN International, signed a historic deal with the PanAmSat to bring the first trans-Pacific Asian programming service to some two million Filipino immigrants in the United States using the then-newly launched PAS 2 satellite. The following day, TFC was officially launched, first as a cable only network serving millions of Filipino Americans countrywide.

The first headquarters of TFC was built in a garage in Daly City, California with only eight employees doing all the tasks from managing the phones, the computers, and the like. By 1995, TFC has grown to 25,000 subscribers in the United States. Airings of Mara Clara and other programming aired during the daytime and night in 1997 Esperanza and Mula Sa Puso where the biggest programs on TFC

By 2004, TFC has grown to 250,000 subscribers in the United States. This growth led to the expansion of TFC to other territories in the world.

In 2005, ABS-CBN International signed an affiliation agreement with DirecTV, one of the leading DTH providers in the United States. Under the deal, DirecTV has the exclusive right to distribute the TFC package on its DTH platform. In return, DirecTV will pay license fees to ABS-CBN and to ABS-CBN International. Later that year, the now defunct and award-winning internet television service TFC Now! was launched. This was later replaced by TFC.tv video streaming website. In this year, ABS-CBN International acquired San Francisco International Gateway from Loral Space & Communications. SFIG is a telecommunications port company based in Richmond, California. SFIG provides satellite communications services through its 2.5 acre (1 hectare) facility consisting of 19 satellite dish antennas and 9 modular equipment buildings. ABS-CBN International received Federal Communications Commission licensing approval in April 2006. Also in this year, ABS-CBN International opened its state-of-the-art studio and office in Redwood City, California. In 2006, SFIG successfully handled the pay per view distribution to In Demand and DirecTV for the Manny Pacquiao vs. Oscar Larios super featherweight championship title fight. SFIG's customers include Discovery Communications, CBS, ESPN, Playboy among others. SFIG is a member of the World Teleport Association.

In 2007, ABS-CBN Global launched Myx (now Myx TV), the first and only television channel in the United States that is targeted to the Asian-American youth audience. As of 2011, TFC has over 2.47 million subscribers worldwide. In the same year, TFC changed their logo. As of 2015, The Filipino Channel has over three million subscribers worldwide most of which are in United States, Middle East, Australia, New Zealand, Japan, South Korea, Taiwan, Hong Kong, Europe, Africa, Canada and Southeast Asia (Thailand, Singapore, Malaysia, Indonesia).

In March 2012, ABS-CBN Global has chosen Etere to integrate its production facility for TFC. The ABS-CBN facility manages 24 channels with 3 different video servers in 3 different formats.(NLE).

On February 23, 2018, TFC IPTV and TFC Direct via cable and satellite subscribers had instant online access to TFC Online (now iWantTFC) with TFC Everywhere (TVE) feature.

In early February 2021, seven TFC channels went live with Amagi cloud platform to consolidate its play-out operations on the cloud to expand its reach and gain greater flexibility. Amagi is a global leader in SaaS for broadcast and streaming TV. ABS-CBN now manages end-to-end workflow on the cloud, eliminating the need for expensive hardware and broadcast center operations, giving it the flexibility to run its global channels with live news from anywhere. Amagi clients include A+E Networks, beIN Sports, Discovery Networks, IMG and Warner Media, among others.

There are currently 7 different international feeds broadcasting to Europe, Middle East, Asia Pacific, Guam-Australia-New Zealand, USA East, USA West and Canada.

On September 1, 2020, TFC Online was merged with iWant to make the service accessible worldwide and was soft launched as iWantTFC.

Programming

The program line-up of The Filipino Channel is composed primarily of programs from ABS-CBN, a national television network in the Philippines. Programming ranging from news, public affairs, documentaries, public service, reality shows, soap operas, teleseryes, talk shows, sitcoms, gag shows, live events, and other formats and genres are shown on TFC in a slightly delayed basis and are synchronized automatically depending on the location of the broadcast. TFC also airs some programs produced abroad by ABS-CBN's foreign subsidiaries in United States, Asia-Pacific, Middle East, and Europe.  These are generally not aired on ABS-CBN's main domestic channel but some are shown on ANC several hours or days after their original airing.

In 2007 the short lived Hero TV on TFC aired in April 2007-August 2007 and since 2019, most of iWant original programs and films are also aired on the channel, as well as on TFC IPTV and TFC Online (formerly ABS-CBN now).

TFC has been relatively unaffected by the ABS-CBN franchise renewal controversy which started May 6, 2020, after the network's legislative franchise to operate domestically over-the-air expired the day before, as it is not under the purview of the Philippine National Telecommunications Commission.

On February 1, 2021, The Filipino Channel relaunched its programming lineup with new shows and more viewing options with the classification of four blocks: Early Mornings, FUNanghalian, Teleserye Playback and Primetime Bida, similar to its Philippine-based counterpart.

TFC Direct 
In 1996, TFC Direct! was launched, an independently operated direct-to-home cable and satellite television service that incorporates the TV channels Sarimanok News Network (now ABS-CBN News Channel), Pinoy Blockbuster Channel (now Cinema One), Pinoy Central (later renamed as Kapamilya Channel, then it was replaced by Bro, and it was replaced again by now-defunct ABS-CBN Sports + Action (S+A)), and the radio channels DZMM Radyo Patrol 630 and WRR 101.9 For Life! (now MOR 101.9).

Filipino On Demand 
Filipino On Demand (FOD) is a video on demand service providing access to Filipino films, ABS-CBN classic shows and live concerts each month available on various cable providers in USA, Canada, Singapore and UAE.

TFC IPTV

Launched on April 30, 2007, TFC IPTV (formerly known as TFCko) is an IPTV and video on demand (VOD) service distributed around the world under the brand of The Filipino Channel. To avail of the service, users must acquire the TFC IPTV set-top box, connect the box to a TV set (HDMI for HDTVs, composite for SDTVs) and broadband internet through WiFi or Ethernet (requires 2 Mbit/s minimum speed), and subscribe to monthly subscription. The channel line up will depend on the subscription package availed and may include the live-streaming of TV channels The Filipino Channel, Myx TV, the international feeds of ABS-CBN News Channel, Cinema One, Cine Mo!, Jeepney TV, Kapamilya Channel, Knowledge Channel as well as radio channels ABS-CBN TeleRadyo and My Only Radio (Manila station), and an in-house interactive Karaoke channel. Aside from the live-streaming of ABS-CBN channels, the service also includes a video on demand feature that allow users to watch, pause, rewind, fast-forward select programs of the channels anytime for a period of one month and in high-definition format (for select programs and internet speed). The service also offers a wide selection of fresh movies from the Philippines and other pay per view contents like concerts and sporting events also in high-definition format. As of January 1, 2020, TFC IPTV has been discontinued sales in Canada and the United States of America but will still provide service to existing users of the IPTV services.

Channels 

 ABS-CBN TeleRadyo
 ANC Global
 Cine Mo! Global
 Cinema One Global
 Myx TV
 TFC HD

Video on demand 

 iWantTFC Originals
 Jeepney TV
 Karaoke
 KBO Unlimited
 MOR Entertainment
 TFC PPV
 Viva

Studio TFC

See also
A2Z
ABS-CBN
GMA Pinoy TV
Kapamilya Channel
Kapatid TV5 Channel

References

Further reading

External links
 

 
International broadcasters
International broadcasting
Television networks in the United States
Direct broadcast satellite services
Filipino-American culture in California
Cable television in the United States
Television channels and stations established in 1994
Filipino diaspora
Assets owned by ABS-CBN Corporation
1994 establishments in the Philippines
Filipino-language television stations
ABS-CBN Corporation channels